Tiruchi Loganathan Maharajan is a musician. He is a Tamil classical and Tamil playback singer. He is the eldest son of Tiruchi Loganathan, who is the first playback singer in the Tamil music industry. He is also the grandson of Kalaimaamani C.T Raajakaantham. Aged 10, TLM acted and sang in a play called "Vallalar". His booming voice was well noted and echoed across the stage. Two years later, in the year 1967, he began a career in playback singing through the devotional movie "Thiruvarutchelvar". The song "Kaadhalagi Kasindhu", which he sang with the Legendary Simma Kuraloan T.M.Soundarraajan, composed by K.V. Mahadevan is a heart wrenching  devotional number. With 50 years of experience in play back singing. This singer, who has worked with most prolific names in the Tamil Music industry, has sung the most unexpected numbers. Though he sings devotional songs most of the time, TLM has also sung songs like "Nee Kattum Selai" from "Puthiya Mannargal" "Unnai Kelai" from "Desam" "Rettajadai Rakkamma" from "Anbe Anbe", Kadhal Yogi" from "Taalam", "Buck Buck Buck" from "Parthiban Kanavu" Avanapathi (Avan Ivan). TL Maharajan, though associated with the greatness of his father, has marked a solid place for himself in the music industry worldwide. TL Maharajan has been a Judge for many singing competitions programs worldwide.

Personal life 

T.L Maharajan, was born to Trichy Loganathan & Rajalakshmi Loganathan. He is also the grandson of C.T Raajakaantham,  who is one of the leading onscreen female jambavan during the early times in the Tamil cinema industry. He is the elder brother of Tamil playback singer, Dheepan Chakravarthy. He is also closely related to M.K Thiyagaraaja Bagavathar. T.L Maharajan is married to Nirmala Devi with whom he has a daughter - Adhilakshmi Keerthana Kughaan.

Albums
Ayyappan Thunai
Bhakthi Maalai (vol 1)
Gajamuga
Gananatha Om Gananatha
Ganapathi Saranam
Ganesha
Kandha
Kumbeshwara
Murugan Arul
Murugan Shanmugan
Sabarikkattil Saranamazhai
Sabarimalai Yaathirai
Sri Bhairava
Sri Bhairavar Kavasam
Thirunaamam (sri Venkateshwara)
Thulasi Malai
Uzhaikkum Kaigale May Day Special
Velayutha Saravanane Murugaiya
Vinayagar Agaval & Suprabatham
Vinayagar Thunai

Songs

Semmozhi Anthem
T. L. Maharajan was one among the singers who sang the "Semmozhiyaana Thamizh Mozhiyaam" song for the World Classical Tamil Conference 2010. He also appeared on the screen after G. V. Prakash Kumar and was followed by Bombay Jayashri. The visualisation of the theme song was directed by the renowned director Gautham Vasudev Menon which had an extremely positive response from the audience. The song features the fusion of various musical cultures including Carnatic, Folk, Acoustic, Sufi, Rock and Rap.

The Lyrics of the song was written by the popular politician M. Karunanidhi and composed by A. R. Rahman. The other popular singers who sang the theme song are T. M. Soundararajan, P. Susheela, Bombay Jayashri, Aruna Sayeeram, Nithyasree Mahadevan, S. Sowmya, T. M. Krishna, Srinivas, Naresh Iyer, Harini, Chinmayi, Karthik, Hariharan, Yuvan Shankar Raja, Vijay Yesudas, G. V. Prakash Kumar, Blaaze, Lady Kash, Shruthi Hassan and Chinna Ponnu.

References

Living people
Tamil playback singers
Singers from Chennai
Male actors in Tamil cinema
Indian male voice actors
Indian male playback singers
People from Tiruchirappalli district
1954 births